The 8th Assam Legislative Assembly election was held in two phases in 1985 to elect members from 126 constituencies in Assam, India.

The Nellie massacre and Khoirabari massacre were some cases of extreme violence.  The unrest officially ended on 15 August 1985, following the Assam Accord, which was signed by leaders of AASU-AAGSP and the Government of India. During this period of six long years of the historic movement as reported 855(later on 860 as submitted by AASU) nos of peoples sacrificed their lives in the hope of an "Infiltration Free Assam" in the 1979-1985 Assam agitation.

The agitation leaders formed a political party, Asom Gana Parishad post-election and Prafulla Kumar Mahanta became youngest Chief Minister of Assam.

Party positions

Winning candidates

By-elections

Government 

Asom Gana Parishad was formed after the historic Assam Accord of 1985 and formally launched at the Golaghat Convention held from 13–14 October 1985 in Golaghat, that let Prafulla Kumar Mahanta to be elected as the youngest chief minister of the state.

References 

Assam
State Assembly elections in Assam
1980s in Assam